The following lists events that happened during 1968 in Singapore.

Incumbents
President: Yusof Ishak
Prime Minister: Lee Kuan Yew

Events

January
 17 January – Britain announces its intention to withdraw its armed forces from Singapore by 1971.
 30 January – The Ellenborough Market is destroyed in a fire, causing S$253,000 in damages and affecting about 1000 hawkers and stall-holders. The market is demolished a few years later.

April
 13 April – The PAP wins the 1968 General Election.

May
 1 May – The Hindu Endowments Board is formed.
 23 May – Singapore Pools is formed as a state-owned lottery firm to combat triads and illegal syndicates.

June
 1 June – Jurong Town Corporation is formed to develop Singapore's industries, taking over this role from the Economic Development Board.
 7 June – Institute of Southeast Asian Studies (ISEAS) is established as a think-tank to research on trends and politics in Southeast Asia and beyond.

July
 1 July – The Islamic Religious Council of Singapore (known as MUIS) is established.

September
 1 September -
The Development Bank of Singapore (now DBS) commences operations.
Keppel Shipyard is established to take over PSA's ship-repair and shipbuilding services.
The Singapore Air Defence Command is formed.
 17 September – The first A&W store opens at MSA Building, making it Singapore's first fast food restaurant. This went on until 2003, when A&W decided to leave Singapore. It made a return in 2019 to Jewel Changi Airport.

October
 1 October – The Keep Singapore Clean campaign is launched.
 17 October – The two marines were hanged for their roles in the MacDonald House bombing.

November
 5 November – Intraco Ltd is formed to promote Singapore goods overseas.

December
 17 December – Sembawang Shipyard was handed back to Singapore.
 30 December – Neptune Orient Lines is formed as Singapore's national shipping line.

Births
 10 January – Zoe Tay, actress.
 8 July – Josephine Teo, Minister for Communications and Information.
 8 August – Ng Chee Meng, Former Minister in Prime Minister's Office.
 10 August – Kumar, comedian.
 16 October – Mark Lee, comedian.
 Lau Siew Mei, writer.

Deaths
 27 October – Sir George Oehlers, 1st Speaker of the Legislative Assembly of Singapore from 1955 to 1963 (b. 1908).

References 

 
Singapore
Years in Singapore